Hristo Karastoyanov (born 22 February 1950) is a contemporary Bulgarian novelist.

Born in Topolovgrad, he studied Bulgarian Philology at Plovdiv University and made his debut in 1981 with the "Cracked Asphalt" stories.

He is the author of 26 books – fiction, political journalism, and poetry. His novel, Autopia: The Other Road to Hell, (2003), is in the list of the first five books nominated for the Vick Foundation award. Others books of his (Nefertiti in a Dark Night, 2001, Death Is of Preference, 2003, Consequences, 2005, Resistance.net, 2008, and The Spider, 2008) have been nominated for the award of Helikon Bookstores. These include his latest novel The Name, 2012.

He has been awarded a number of literary prizes, among which was the first prize in the unpublished novel contest of Razvitie Corporation (for his novel Death is of Preference, 2003), the award of the Bulgarian Writers’ Union for Notes on Historical Naiveté, 1999, the “Golden Chainlet” short-story award of Trud Daily, and the national “Chudomir” award for humorous story.

His book, Kocama Karı Arıyorum (in Turkish Wanted: A Wife for My Husband), “Janet 45” Publishing house, 2006, was presented at the 25th Istanbul Book Fair (2006).

He is a member of the professional Bulgarian Writers’ Union. He works and lives in Yambol. 
Hristo Karastoyanov is married and has a son and grandchildren, one bearing the same name.

Books 

T for Tashkent, novel, 2021
Dodder, novel, 2020
Life has no second half, novel, 2018
The Same Night Awaits Us All: Diary of a Novel, novel, (in English in the US), 2018
Postscript, novel, 2016
The Same Night Awaits Us All: Diary of a Novel, novel, 2014
Teufelszwirn, Roman in drei Büchern. Aus dem Bulgarischen von Andreas Tretner. Dittrich Verlag GmbH, Berlin 2012
The Name, novel, 2012
The Spider, novel, 2009, reprint 2011
Resistance.net, novel, 2008
Parallel Paranoias, stories, (two volumes – ID: The Year of the Tiger and 2007: Extant Memories), 2008
Atlantis: Acts, novel, (bilingual: Bulgarian and English), 2008
Kocama Karı Arıyorum, stories, in Turkish (“Wanted: A Wife for My Husband”) 2006
Consequences, stories, 2005
La Vie En Rose and Others of That Type, stories, 2004
Death Is of Preference, novel, 2003
Autopia: The Other Road to Hell, novel, 2003
Nefertiti in a Winter Night, stories, 2001
ID: The Year of the Tiger, stories, (co-writer: Lyubomir Kotev), 2000
Notes on Historical Naiveté, political journalism, 1999
The Death of Sancho Panzo, poetry, 1997
Life: The Third Lie, stories, 1996
Dusty Summer, novel, 1995
Notes from the Times When the Future Was Bright, stories, 1993
Dodder (trilogy: Perpetuum Mobile, Dodder and Mixed Up Chronicle), 1990 and 2001
Ripe Taste, stories, 1989
Mixed Up Chronicle, novel, 1987
This Eternal Land, political journalism, 1985
Perpetuum Mobile, novel, 1984
Matvei Valev, literary critical essay, 1982
Cracked Asphalt, stories, 1981

External links
Karastoyanov at his Bulgarian publisher's website
 Karastoyanov at the Contemporary Bulgarian Writers website
Karastoyanov at his German publisher's website
Karastoyanov at Goethe Institut - Germany

1950 births
Living people
Bulgarian writers
People from Topolovgrad